TriNet Group, Inc. is an American cloud-based professional employer organization for small and medium-sized businesses. TriNet administers payroll and health benefits and advises clients on employment law compliance and risk reduction, acting in some cases as an outsourced human resources department. TriNet is headquartered in Dublin, California. TriNet partners with organizations between 3 and 2,500 employees.

Founded in 1988, TriNet initially offered basic employee benefits, dental coverage, life and disability insurance and employment law guidance. Since then, TriNet has broadened its offerings to add payroll services, Fortune-500 benefits, 401(k) guidance, worker's compensation, liability insurance, and strategic human resources support and services. The company also provides online tools such as web-hosted management portals for a manager and employee self-service.

History
TriNet was founded in 1988 by entrepreneur Martin Babinec in San Leandro, California. Babinec led TriNet through several acquisitions of smaller professional employer organizations, including Boston-based HR Logic Holdings, John Parry & Alexander and the Outsource Group of Walnut Creek, Calif.; E3 Group of Dallas; and Boston-based HR Logic Holdings. At the same time, the company went through its own rounds of equity financing, including an investment by U.K.-based staffing firm Select Holdings, LLC (later renamed as Vedior). In 2000, the company incorporated as TriNet Group. In 2004, Vedior sold its minority interest in TriNet to General Atlantic, a growth equity firm.

In May 2008, Burton Goldfield joined the company as president and CEO. Babinec remained at the company as a director.

In March 2014 TriNet launched its initial public offering (IPO) on the New York Stock Exchange with ticker symbol TNET and became a public company.

Acquisition history 
 2003: TriNet acquired two professional employer organizations, including the west coast assets of ALTRES and the E3 Group.    
 2006: Trinet completed the acquisition of Outsource Group, a human resources service provider.   
 2007: TriNet acquired human resources outsourcing and consulting firm John Parry & Alexander.  
 2008: TriNet acquired LMC Resources, a professional employer organization focused on emerging markets. 
 June 1, 2009: TriNet completed its acquisition of Gevity (NASDAQ: GVHR), a human resources outsourcing company based in Bradenton, Florida.
 May 9, 2012: TriNet completed its acquisition of ExpenseCloud. ExpenseCloud helps businesses manage expense reporting online and from mobile devices.
 April 26, 2012: TriNet announced its acquisition of AccordHR in Oklahoma City.
 October 25, 2012: TriNet closed its acquisition of Strategic Outsourcing and became the largest, independent professional employer organization in the U.S. 
 July 2, 2013: TriNet acquired Ambrose Employer Group. Ambrose is a New York City-based professional employer organization.
 July 27, 2020: TriNet acquired Little Bird HR. Little Bird HR is a New York City-based professional employer organization.
 February 15, 2022: Trinet closed its acquisition of Zenefits.

Recognition and media highlights
In the 1990s, TriNet was a member of the Inc. 500 Hall of Fame for five consecutive listings on the magazine's ranking of fastest growing, privately held American companies (#12 in 1995, #79 in 1996, #166 in 1997, #319 in 1998 and #381 in 1999). In 2008, TriNet ranked #3,369 in the Inc. 5000, as well as #13 in the East Bay Business Times list of fastest growing, privately held companies. TriNet repeated the Inc. 5000 honor in 2009, with a #2185 listing, and in 2010, at #1601.

In 2011, TriNet was recognized as a fast-growth company by Inc. Magazine for the fourth year in a row.

In 2012 and 2013, Ernst & Young named TriNet CEO Burton Goldfield finalist for Entrepreneur of the Year Award.

TriNet has been accredited by the Employer Services Assurance Corporation since 1995. This certification validates the solid financial performance of professional employer organizations, and the assurance of their employer-compliant operations and services, continually monitoring them for adherence to important financial, ethical, and operational standards.

In March 2012, CEO Burton Goldfield's article titled "Age Discrimination Case Highlights Exposure Fast-Growing Companies Face" was published in Forbes.

In December 2014, CEO Burton Goldfield made a second appearance on Jim Cramer's Mad Money.

In March 2015, Charles Passy, reporter MarketWatch interviewed TriNet CEO Burton Goldfield in the article "A Bigger Paycheck for TriNet".

In May 2015, TriNet was recognized as one of the top 50 B2B vendors in the United States by their customers. In the same year, TriNet is named one of the Bay Area's Best and Brightest Companies to Work For® by the National Association for Business Resources.

In 2017, TriNet was named one of the 100 Fastest-Growing Companies by Fortune Magazine and one of Selling Power magazine's 50 Best Companies to Sell For, for the fourth consecutive year.

References

External links
 

1988 establishments in California
2014 initial public offerings
American companies established in 1988
Companies based in Alameda County, California
Dublin, California
Companies listed on the New York Stock Exchange
Human resource management
Payroll
Software companies based in the San Francisco Bay Area
Software companies established in 1988
Software companies of the United States
Business services companies of the United States